Isocarpha megacephala is a New World species of plants in the family Asteraceae. It has been found only in northeastern Brazil (Bahia, Pernambuco, Paraíba).

References

Eupatorieae
Endemic flora of Brazil
Plants described in 1925